The West End is a working-class neighborhood of New Rochelle, New York. 

The West End's borders include Metro North's New Haven Rail Line in the south, the border with Pelham, New York on the west, Sickles Avenue on the north and Memorial Highway on the east.

The West End is included in New Rochelle's political district. It is home to a predominantly Hispanic population. It is home to Montefiore New Rochelle Hospital. The ZIP code is 10801.

Neighborhoods in New Rochelle, New York